Legacy Union, formerly known as 620 South Tryon, is a multi-building development currently finished in Uptown Charlotte, North Carolina. It broke ground on August 4, 2017 and finished in 2021. The development includes the world headquarters of Honeywell and major corporate offices for Deloitte, JLL, Bank of America, and Robinson Bradshaw.

History

The site of the development is located on the former site of the Charlotte Observer.  It is a mixed use development that spans two city blocks and is bordered by Tryon St, Stonewall St, Mint St, and Interstate 277.  Lincoln Harris and Goldman Sachs purchased the 10-acre property in 2016 for a price of $37.5 million.  The land was purchased in 3 transactions.  The first transaction was 5 acres for $11 million which closed in April 2016. The second transaction was the site of the Charlotte Observer building which was 4.1 acres for $23.1 million, the sale closed in May 2016. The final transaction was for a .7 acre site that closed in September 2016. In 2017 when the development was originally being discussed only the first building, the Bank of America Tower, was being discussed. Demolition of the Charlotte Observer building began on August 1, 2016.

The name was chosen to honor the past and celebrate Charlotte's future.  The way developer Lincoln Harris intents to celebrate Charlotte future is by making the site a destination for people to gather.  A pedestrian connecting Tryon Street and Bank of America Stadium patterned after plazas in London, Paris, and Rome will accomplish this.  Also, the developer will be including retail space and possibly a convention center hotel containing more than 1,000 rooms.

Buildings

Bank of America Tower
Bank of America signed on as the anchor tenant is August 2017, agreeing to occupy  of the  building. The building topped out in September 2018 and delivered in August 2019. Bank of America also has a retail branch accessible through the lobby of the building. Bank of America began moving their employees in during August 2019 initially only into floors 14 and 15. At that time the tower was 90% leased. The bank employees that will occupy the building are coming from Bank of America Corporate Center and 1 Bank of America Center. Bank of America stated they plan to use some of the floors as collaborative work space without assigned seating. Bank of America has consolidated 2,000 employees from all over the city across 22 floors of the building. This has allowed the bank to reduce its Charlotte real estate footprint by 100,000 square feet.

In August 2019, Raleigh-based Highwoods Properties agreed to purchase the tower for $436 million. The deal closed in November 2019, the price slightly increased to $441 million and it was a record setting sale price for the state of North Carolina until Truist Financial agreed to purchase the former Hearst Tower now Truist Center for $455 million.  The purchase gave Highwoods Properties their first property in the Charlotte market. The property was marketed by multiple Cushman & Wakefield groups to about 50 to 75 investors worldwide that normally did not have Charlotte on their radar. Selling the property was not a problem since at the time Charlotte had a growing and diverse economy.

The expansion would be in the building's podium and would be used for a speculative office development. Also rooftop amenities are being considered. The goal would be to provide a variety of space use options to meet customer demands.

On June 17, 2022, architecture firm Gresham Smith announced it has signed a 10 year lease for 15,000 to 17,000 square feet of space in Bank of America Tower. Its 50 local employees will be moving from its current 8,000 square foot space at Charlotte Plaza, 201 S. College St. The company will begin occupying the space in the spring of 2023.

On July 27, 2022, UNC Chapel Hill's Kenan-Flager Business School announced it will open a Charlotte campus in Bank of America Tower with classes to begin in the fall semester. The school will occupy temporary space on the third floor until its permanent home on the fourth floor composed of 16,000 square feet can be built. Placement on the fourth floor will give the school easy access to parking and outdoor space that will be used for functions.

On September 20, 2022, the Atlantic Coast Conference announced it will be moving its headquarters from Greensboro to Charlotte. The conference currently occupies a 18,500 square foot building that it owns in Greensboro. They will move into a similar amount of space in the Bank of America Tower. The conference has stated that during the current academic year they will be occupying the space and all 50 employees will be relocating to Charlotte.

650 South Tryon
The second phase of the Legacy Union development includes the 18-story, 290-ft-tall 650 South Tryon building, which includes  of office space. It sits on 2.2 acres of the 10 acre development and is located at the corner of Hill and South Tryon. Deloitte is the anchor tenant, leasing .

Deloitte was previously leasing  at the Duke Energy Center. In the Charlotte region, the company has 1,300 employees and is one of the Charlotte area's leading accounting firms.  Other tenants include property management company JLL leasing , New York law firm Cadwalader Wickersham & Taft leasing  which will hold their 89 Charlotte based attorneys, and Robinhood announced they will open a local office in the building to house the 289 employees they will be hiring in Charlotte by 2025.

In May 2022, Highwoods Properties Inc. disclosed its purchase of the building for $203 million. At the time of the deal the building was 78% occupied. The deal is expected to close in the third quarter of 2022.

In August 2022 Robinhood announced it will be closing its Charlotte office and laying off all 82 local employees. This was part of a 23% company wide reduction of workers. However, later in August, San Francisco based Figure Technology announced that they will be subleasing 24,000 square feet, half of Robinhood's space. 90 employees will be moving into the space once Robinhood vacates it.

Honeywell Tower
In late 2018, Honeywell announced it would relocate its corporate headquarters from New Jersey to Charlotte, beginning in 2019 after the company accepted $90 million of state and local incentives. The company began relocating positions in July 2019.  They also looked at the neighborhoods of South End and Ballantyne in Charlotte before deciding on Uptown. In June 2019, Lincoln Harris announced Honeywell will occupy  in the 23-story building in the  building, housing 750 employees. Honeywell will be leasing 10 floors, which is the majority of the leasable floors.  The remaining floors will include ground floor retail, parking, and the lobby.  Construction began in October 2019 with completion in 2021.  In October 2020 Honeywell filed a rezoning petition to put four signs on the building.  In August 2021 Honeywell began to occupy the building by inviting employees back to work after a long period of remote only work due to the COVID-19 pandemic.  As of November 2021, 800 employees now occupy the building.  In September 2022 the building achieved LEED Gold certification.

600 S Tryon
The tower will be anchored by Robinson Bradshaw, who signed a 15-year lease. The firm is one of Charlotte's largest law firms.  At the time of signing the lease the firm was leasing space in 101 Independence Center.  They will occupy  of space over the top four floors.  Construction started in April 2022.  It will be a 24 story tower with  total space including  of ground floor retail.

The location of the building is the exact site of the former Charlotte Observer building.

Parking
A common parking deck providing 3,104 parking spaces with four levels of executive parking is located at 720 South Church Street.

See also
 Uptown Charlotte
 List of tallest buildings in Charlotte

References

External links
 

Skyscraper office buildings in Charlotte, North Carolina
Skyscrapers in Charlotte, North Carolina
Proposed skyscrapers in the United States